Budíškovice is a municipality and village in Jindřichův Hradec District in the South Bohemian Region of the Czech Republic. It has about 700 inhabitants.

Administrative parts
Villages of Manešovice, Ostojkovice and Vesce are administrative parts of Budíškovice. Ostojkovice forms an exclave of the municipal territory.

References

External links

 

Villages in Jindřichův Hradec District